Eric Gerard Hayes (born November 12, 1967) is a former American football defensive tackle  who played four seasons in the National Football League (NFL) with the Seattle Seahawks, Los Angeles Rams, Tampa Bay Buccaneers. He was drafted by the Seahawks in the fifth round of the 1990 NFL Draft. He played college football at Florida State University and attended C. Leon King High School in Tampa, Florida. Hayes was also a member of the Connecticut Coyotes of the Arena Football League (AFL).

College career
Hayes played for the Florida State Seminoles from 1986 to 1989. He was redshirted in 1985. He earned Associated Press Honorable Mention All-American honors in 1987. Hayes also garnered Football News Third-team All-American and The Sporting News Honorable Mention All-American accolades in 1989.

Professional career
Hayes was selected by the Seattle Seahawks of the NFL with the 119th pick in the 1990 NFL Draft. He played in 21 games, starting three, for the Seahawks from 1990 to 1991. He played in one game for the NFL's Los Angeles Rams in 1992. Hayes played in two games for the Tampa Bay Buccaneers of the NFL during the 1993 season. He played for the AFL's Connecticut Coyotes in 1995.

References

External links
 Just Sports Stats

Living people
1967 births
Players of American football from Tampa, Florida
American football defensive tackles
African-American players of American football
Florida State Seminoles football players
Seattle Seahawks players
Los Angeles Rams players
Tampa Bay Buccaneers players
Connecticut Coyotes players
C. Leon King High School alumni
21st-century African-American people
20th-century African-American sportspeople